Spyridium phylicoides, commonly known as narrow-leaved spyridium, is a species of flowering plant in the family Rhamnaceae and is endemic to South Australia. It is a low shrub with rigid, linear or lance-shaped leaves, and heads of woolly-hairy flowers.

Description
The upper surface of the leaves is glabrous and the lower surface woolly-hairy, but often hidden by the inrolled edges of the upper surface. The heads of "flowers" are more or less sessile,  in diameter and woolly-hairy with 2 to 5 floral leaves shorter but broader than the stem leaves.

Taxonomy
This species was first formally described in 1858 by Siegfried Reissek in the journal Linnaea from specimens collected by Johann Wilhelmi, near Lake Hamilton in 1855. The specific epithet (phylicoides) means "Phylica-like".

Distribution
Spyridium phylicoides occurs in the Nullarbor, Eyre Peninsula, Murray, Yorke Peninsula, Southern Lofty, Kangaroo Island and South Eastern botanical regions of south-eastern South Australia.

References

phylicoides
Rosales of Australia
Flora of South Australia
Plants described in 1855